The GenSan Warriors are a professional basketball team currently playing in the Maharlika Pilipinas Basketball League. It has played in National Basketball Conference from 2007 to 2008 as GenSan MP PacMan Warriors, in Liga Pilipinas from 2008 to 2011 as MP-GenSan Warriors (both of which is in honor of Manny Pacquiao), and in Maharlika Pilipinas Basketball League from 2018.

History

Mindanao Visayas Basketball Association (MVBA)

National Basketball Conference (2007-2008)

Maharlika Pilipinas Basketball League
They joined MPBL during the expansion of the program. And to not confuse them with Golden State Warriors, they refer themselves as GenSan Warriors.

Current roster

Depth chart

Head coaches

Notable players

Liga Pilipinas

 Jasper Callo
 John Eric Coronado
 Peter Deligero
 Noberto Farochillen
 Alfred John Gonzaga
 Bob Cozy Ilanga
 Jeffy Locsin
 Louie Benn Medalla
 Moorice Mejorada
 Donamar Mendoza
 Jay-R Olegario
 Bobby Pacquiao
 Manny Pacquiao
 Roderick Ramos
 Jethron Recustodio
 Abdul Fariq Dave Sagad
 Donald Tadena

MPBL

 Jeremy Alan Bartolo
 Marlon Basco (2018–present)
 Ervic Vijandre

Season-by-season records
Records from the 2022-23 MPBL season:

References

General Santos Warriors
Maharlika Pilipinas Basketball League teams
National Basketball Conference teams
Liga Pilipinas teams
2005 establishments in the Philippines